The Ålfotbreen glacier is located in Vestland county, Norway.  The  glacier is located on the border of three municipalities in the Nordfjord region:  Bremanger, Kinn, and Gloppen.  It is located west of the village of Hyen, south of the village of Ålfoten, and east of the village of Svelgen.

On 9 January 2009, the  area surrounding the glacier, the glacier itself, and the nearby Gjegnalundsbreen glacier, were preserved as a landscape protection area by the Norwegian government.

Mass balance measurements have been performed at the glacier since 1963 by the Norwegian Water Resources and Energy Directorate (NVE).

See also
List of glaciers in Norway

References

Glaciers of Vestland
Gloppen
Bremanger
Kinn